Hayton is a small village and civil parish in Cumbria, England, roughly  east of Carlisle, and  from the England/Scotland border. The population of the parish taken at the 2011 census was 2,222.

The place name Hayton means hay farm and refers to the former farming in the area. There is a separate settlement named Hayton within Cumbria near Aspatria. St. Mary Magdalene Church was built in 1780. In the church are a number of memorials to the Graham family of Edmond Castle. Edmond Castle, a mile from the village, is thought to date from earlier than the 17th century. The nearby Toppin Castle farmhouse is a nineteenth-century imitation tower house.

Places of interest
Edmond Castle
Hayton Church of England primary school
WI Hall, biannual Christmas pantomime
St Mary Magdelene Church, the parish church
Walnut Field, named after a walnut tree, the venue of the Bonfire Night celebrations
The Stone Inn (public house)

Notable people
Field Marshal Sir Hew Dalrymple Ross (1779–1868), of Stone House 
General Sir John Ross (1829–1905), of Stone House

Governance
An electoral ward in the same name exists. The population of this ward taken at the 2011 Census was 2,064.

See also

Listed buildings in Hayton, Carlisle
King Water
Solway Plain
Talkin

References

External links
 Cumbria County History Trust: Hayton (nb: provisional research only – see Talk page)

 
Villages in Cumbria
Civil parishes in Cumbria
City of Carlisle